The list of ship commissionings in 2007 includes a chronological list of all ships commissioned in 2007.


See also 

2007
 Ship commissionings